Antaliya may refer to the following places in India:

 Antaliya, Navsari, a town in Navsari district, Gujarat
 Antaliya, Amreli, a village in Amreli district, Gujarat
 Antaliya, Rajsamand, a village in Rajsamand district, Rajasthan
 Antaliya, Udaipur, a village in Udaipur district, Rajasthan

See also 
 Antalya, a city in Turkey